"Your Memory Ain't What It Used to Be" is a song recorded by American country music artist Mickey Gilley. It was released in December 1985 as the second and final single from his album I Feel Good About Lovin' You. The song reached number 5 on the U.S. Billboard Hot Country Singles chart and number 2 on the Canadian RPM Country Tracks chart in Canada. It was written by Mary Fielder, Kim Morrison and Dickey Betts.

Chart performance

References

1985 singles
1985 songs
Mickey Gilley songs
Songs written by Dickey Betts
Song recordings produced by Norro Wilson
Epic Records singles